The United States women's national water polo team represents the United States in international women's water polo competitions and friendly matches. It is one of the leading teams in the world since the late 1990s.

On March 27, 2009, USA Water Polo named Adam Krikorian the head coach of the United States women's national team. Krikorian was the UCLA men's and women's water polo team head coach.

Results

Major tournaments

Competitive record
Updated after the 2020 World League.

Olympic Games

 2000 –  Silver medal
 2004 –  Bronze medal
 2008 –  Silver medal
 2012 –  Gold medal
 2016 –  Gold medal
 2020 –  Gold medal

World Championship

 1986 –  Bronze medal
 1991 –  Bronze medal
 1994 – 4th place
 1998 – 8th place
 2001 – 4th place
 2003 –  Gold medal
 2005 –  Silver medal
 2007 –  Gold medal
 2009 –  Gold medal
 2011 – 6th place
 2013 – 5th place
 2015 –  Gold medal
 2017 –  Gold medal
 2019 –  Gold medal
 2022 –  Gold medal

World Cup

 1979 –  Gold medal
 1980 –  Silver medal
 1981 – 4th place
 1983 –  Silver medal
 1984 –  Silver medal
 1988 – 4th place
 1989 –  Silver medal
 1991 –  Bronze medal
 1993 – 5th place
 1995 – 6th place
 1997 – 7th place
 1999 – 6th place
 2002 –  Silver medal
 2006 – 4th place
 2010 –  Gold medal
 2014 –  Gold medal
 2018 –  Gold medal

World League

 2004 –  Gold medal
 2005 – 5th place
 2006 –  Gold medal
 2007 –  Gold medal
 2008 –  Silver medal
 2009 –  Gold medal
 2010 –  Gold medal
 2011 –  Gold medal
 2012 –  Gold medal
 2013 –  Bronze medal
 2014 –  Gold medal
 2015 –  Gold medal
 2016 –  Gold medal
 2017 –  Gold medal
 2018 –  Gold medal
 2019 –  Gold medal
 2020 –  Gold medal
 2022 –  Bronze medal

Pan American Games

 1999 –  Silver medal
 2003 –  Gold medal
 2007 –  Gold medal
 2011 –  Gold medal
 2015 –  Gold medal
 2019 –  Gold medal

Minor tournaments
The United States is usually represented by a U20 team in these competitions.

Summer Universiade

 2011 –  Silver medal
 2013 – 8th place
 2015 – 5th place
 2017 –  Gold medal
 2019 – 8th place

ASUA Cup (UANA Cup)
 2013 –  Gold medal

Holiday Cup

 1998 –  Silver medal
 1999 –  Bronze medal
 2000 –  Gold medal
 2001 –  Gold medal
 2002 –  Gold medal
 2003 –  Gold medal
 2004 –  Gold medal
 2006 –  Gold medal
 2007 –  Bronze medal

Kirishi Cup
 2014 –  Gold medal

World Games
 1981 –  Silver medal

Olympic Year Tournament
 1996 – 7th place

Team

Current squad
Roster for the 2020 Summer Olympics.

Former squads

Olympic Games

 2000 –  Silver medal
 Bernice Orwig (GK), Heather Petri, Ericka Lorenz, Brenda Villa, Ellen Estes, Coralie Simmons, Maureen O'Toole, Julie Swail (Captain), Heather Moody, Robin Beauregard, Nicolle Payne (GK), Kathy Sheehy, Courtney Johnson. Head Coach: Guy Baker.

 2004 –  Bronze medal
 Jackie Frank (GK), Heather Petri, Ericka Lorenz, Brenda Villa, Ellen Estes, Natalie Golda, Margaret Dingeldein, Kelly Rulon, Heather Moody (Captain), Robin Beauregard, Amber Stachowski, Nicolle Payne (GK), Thalia Munro. Head Coach: Guy Baker.

 2008 –  Silver medal
 Betsey Armstrong (GK), Heather Petri, Brittany Hayes, Brenda Villa (Captain), Lauren Wenger, Natalie Golda, Patty Cardenas, Jessica Steffens, Elsie Windes, Alison Gregorka, Moriah van Norman, Kami Craig, Jaime Hipp (GK). Head Coach: Guy Baker.

 2012 –  Gold medal
 Betsey Armstrong (GK), Heather Petri, Melissa Seidemann, Brenda Villa (Captain), Lauren Wenger, Maggie Steffens, Courtney Mathewson, Jessica Steffens, Elsie Windes, Kelly Rulon, Annika Dries, Kami Craig, Tumua Anae (GK). Head Coach: Adam Krikorian.

 2016 –  Gold medal
 Sami Hill (GK), Maddie Musselman, Melissa Seidemann, Rachel Fattal, Caroline Clark, Maggie Steffens (Captain), Courtney Mathewson, Kiley Neushul, Aria Fischer, Kaleigh Gilchrist, Makenzie Fischer, Kami Craig, Ashleigh Johnson (GK). Head Coach: Adam Krikorian.

World Aquatics Championships

 2003 –  Gold medal
Nicolle Payne (GK), Heather Petri, Ericka Lorenz, Brenda Villa, Ellen Estes, Natalie Golda, Margaret Dingeldein, Jackie Frank (GK), Heather Moody (Captain), Robin Beauregard, Amber Stachowski, Gabrielle Domanic, Thalia Munro. Head Coach: Guy Baker.

 2005 –  Silver medal
 Emily Feher, Heather Petri, Ericka Lorenz, Brenda Villa (Captain), Lauren Wenger, Natalie Golda, Kristina Kunkel, Erika Figge, Jamie Hipp, Kelly Rulon, Moriah Van Norman, Drue Wawrzynski, Thalia Munro. Head Coach: Heather Moody

 2007 –  Gold medal
 Betsey Armstrong (GK), Heather Petri, Ericka Lorenz, Brenda Villa (Captain), Lauren Wenger, Natalie Golda, Patricia Cardenas, Brittany Hayes, Elsie Windes, Alison Gregorka, Moriah van Norman, Kami Craig, Jaime Hipp (GK). Head Coach: Guy Baker.

 2009 –  Gold medal
 Betsey Armstrong (GK), Heather Petri, Brittany Hayes, Brenda Villa (Captain), Lauren Wenger, Tanya Gandy, Kelly Rulon, Jessica Steffens, Elsie Windes, Alison Gregorka, Moriah van Norman, Kami Craig, Jaime Hipp (GK). Head Coach: Adam Krikorian.

 2011 – 6th place
 Betsey Armstrong (GK), Heather Petri, Melissa Seidemann, Brenda Villa (Captain), Lauren Wenger, Maggie Steffens, Courtney Mathewson, Jessica Steffens, Elsie Windes, Kelly Rulon, Annika Dries, Kami Craig, Tumua Anae (GK). Head Coach: Adam Krikorian.

 2013 – 5th place
 Betsey Armstrong (GK), Lauren Silver, Melissa Seidemann, Rachel Fattal, Caroline Clark, Maggie Steffens, Courtney Mathewson (Captain), Kiley Neushul, Jillian Kraus, Kelly Rulon, Annika Dries, Kami Craig, Tumua Anae (GK). Head Coach: Adam Krikorian.

 2015 –  Gold medal
 Sami Hill (GK), Maddie Musselman, Melissa Seidemann, Rachel Fattal, Alys Williams, Maggie Steffens (Captain), Courtney Mathewson, Kiley Neushul, Ashley Grossman, Kaleigh Gilchrist, Makenzie Fischer, Kami Craig, Ashleigh Johnson (GK). Head Coach: Adam Krikorian.

 2017 –  Gold medal
 Gabby Stone (GK), Maddie Musselman, Melissa Seidemann, Rachel Fattal, Paige Hauschild, Maggie Steffens (Captain), Jordan Raney, Kiley Neushul, Aria Fischer, Jamie Neushul, Makenzie Fischer, Alys Williams, Amanda Longan (GK). Head Coach: Adam Krikorian.

 2019 –  Gold medal
 Amanda Longan (GK), Maddie Musselman, Melissa Seidemann, Rachel Fattal, Paige Hauschild, Maggie Steffens (Captain), Stephania Haralabidis, Kiley Neushul, Aria Fischer, Kaleigh Gilchrist, Makenzie Fischer, Alys Williams, Ashleigh Johnson (GK). Head Coach: Adam Krikorian.

Pan American Games

 2007 –  Gold medal
 Betsey Armstrong (GK), Patricia Cardenas, Kami Craig, Erika Figge, Natalie Golda, Alison Gregorka, Jaime Hipp (GK), Heather Petri, Jessica Steffens, Moriah van Norman, Brenda Villa (Captain), Lauren Wenger, Elsie Windes. Head Coach: Guy Baker.

 2011 –  Gold medal
Betsey Armstromg, Heather Petri, Melissa Seidemann, Brenda Villa (Captain), Lauren Wenger, Maggie Steffens, Courtney Mathewson, Jessica Steffens, Elsie Windes, Kelly Rulon, Annika Dries, Kami Craig, Tumua Anae (GK). Head Coach: Adam Krikorian

 2015 –  Gold medal
 Sami Hill (GK), Maddie Musselman, Melissa Seidemann, Rachel Fattal, Caroline Clark, Maggie Steffens (Captain), Courtney Mathewson, Kiley Neushul, Ashley Grossman, Kaleigh Gilchrist, Makenzie Fischer, Kami Craig, Ashleigh Johnson (GK). Head Coach: Adam Krikorian

 2019 –  Gold medal
 Ashleigh Johnson (GK), Maddie Musselman, Melissa Seidemann, Rachel Fattal, Stephania Haralabidis, Maggie Steffens (Captain), Jamie Neushul, Kiley Neushul, Aria Fischer, Alys Williams, Makenzie Fischer. Head Coach: Adam Krikorian

Other tournaments

 1979 FINA World Cup –  Gold medal
 Lynn Comer, Laura Cox, Dion Dickinson, Vaune Kadlubek, Debby Kemp, Simone LaPay, Marsha McCuen-Kavanaugh, Sue McIntyre, Maureen O'Toole, Sallie Thomas, and Lyn Taylor.

 1981 FINA World Cup – 4th place
 Lynn Comer, Laura Cox, Ruth Cox, Debbie Decker, Leslie Entwistle, Karen Hastie, Vaune Kadlubek, Simone LaPay, Robin Linn, Sue McIntyre, Maureen O'Toole, Marla Smith

 1981 World Games –  Silver medal
 Lynn Comer, Laura Cox, Ruth Cox, Debbie Decker, Leslie Entwistle, Karen Hastie, Vaune Kadlubek, Simone LaPay, Robin Linn, Sue McIntyre, Maureen O'Toole, Marla Smith

 2004 FINA World League –  Gold medal
 Robin Beauregard, Margaret Dingeldein, Ellen Estes, Jacqueline Frank, Natalie Golda, Ericka Lorenz, Heather Moody, Thalia Munro, Nicolle Payne (GK), Heather Petri, Kelly Rulon, Amber Stachowski, and Brenda Villa. Head Coach: Guy Baker.

 2005 FINA World League – 5th place
 Katherine Hansen, Erika Figge, Natalie Golda, Brittany Hayes, Jaime Hipp (GK), Kristina Kunkel, Ericka Lorenz, Heather Petri, Aimee Stachowski, Moriah van Norman, Brenda Villa, Drue Wawrzynski, and Lauren Wenger. Head Coach: Heather Moody.

 2006 FINA World League –  Gold medal
 Elizabeth Armstrong, Patricia Cardenas, Kami Craig, Erika Figge, Natalie Golda, Alison Gregorka, Ericka Lorenz, Heather Petri, Jessica Steffens, Moriah van Norman, Brenda Villa, Lauren Wenger, and Elsie Windes. Head Coach: Guy Baker.

 2007 FINA World League –  Gold medal
 Elizabeth Armstrong, Patricia Cardenas, Kami Craig, Erika Figge, Natalie Golda, Alison Gregorka, Jaime Hipp (GK), Heather Petri, Jessica Steffens, Moriah van Norman, Brenda Villa, Lauren Wenger, and Elsie Windes. Head Coach: Guy Baker.

Statistics

Olympic Games

Age records

Most appearances
The following tables are pre-sorted by number of appearances, date of last appearance, date of birth, respectively.

Three athletes have each made at least three Olympic appearances. Heather Petri and Brenda Villa are the only two American female water polo players to have competed in four Olympic Games.

Two men have each made at least two Olympic appearances as head coaches of the United States women's national team.

Leading scorers
The following tables are pre-sorted by number of goals, date of the game (match), name of the player, respectively.

Maggie Steffens is the American female water polo player with the most goals at the Olympic Games, scoring 38.

Multiple medalists

Seventeen athletes have each won at least two Olympic medals in water polo. Heather Petri and Brenda Villa are the only two American female water polo players to have won four Olympic medals.

Two men have each won at least two Olympic medals as head coaches of the United States men's national team.

Under-20 team
The United States women have won a record four titles at the FINA Junior Water Polo World Championships.

See also
 United States women's Olympic water polo team records and statistics
 United States men's national water polo team
 USA Water Polo
 USA Water Polo Hall of Fame
 List of Olympic champions in women's water polo
 List of women's Olympic water polo tournament records and statistics
 List of world champions in women's water polo

References

External links
Official website

Women
United States
Women's water polo in the United States